Pristimantis serendipitus is a species of frog in the family Strabomantidae. It is found in the Andes of northern Peru and adjacent southern Ecuador. The specific name refers to serendipitous discovery of this species: collection at the type locality was only made because the road was closed by an accident. Common name Colan Mountains robber frog has been proposed for this species.

Description
Adult males measure  in SVL; adult females are unknown but a subadult female measured  in SVL. The snout is moderately long. The tympanic annulus is distinct. The fingers and toes bear discs but neither webbing nor lateral fringes. Skin is dorsally finely tuberculate. Coloration in pale gray at night and brown with darker marking by day. The venter is gray while the throat is yellow; both are heavily flecked with gray. The iris is dull bronze with median, horizontal red-brown streak.

Habitat and conservation
Calling males have been recorded at night on leaves of low herbaceous plants in highly disturbed, humid, upper montane forest. Female and juveniles have been found on a bush near a stream and in leaf-litter in humid montane forest. Presumably, as in other Pristimantis, development is direct (i.e., there is no free-living larval stage).

It is threatened by habitat loss caused by selective logging and agriculture. The range of this species overlaps with the Cordillera de Colán National Sanctuary (Peru), and it has been recorded from Podocarpus National Park.

References

serendipitus
Frogs of South America
Amphibians of the Andes
Amphibians of Ecuador
Amphibians of Peru
Amphibians described in 1999
Taxa named by William Edward Duellman
Taxonomy articles created by Polbot